Clarion DeWitt Hardy (October 2, 1877 – June 27, 1936) was an American football and baseball coach. He served as the head football coach at Dakota Wesleyan University in three separate stints (1902, 1907–1908, and 1913–1914) compiling a record of 16–14–2. Hardy also had two stints at the head baseball coach at Dakota Wesleyan, from 1905 to 1910 and again in 1913. He later served as a public speaking and debate professor at Northwestern University.

Head coaching record

Football

References

External links
 

1877 births
1936 deaths
Dakota Wesleyan Tigers baseball coaches
Dakota Wesleyan Tigers football coaches
Dakota Wesleyan University alumni
Northwestern University faculty
People from Crawford County, Iowa
Players of American football from Iowa